Nick Murphy is a British film director and television director. He is best known for directing the films The Awakening (2011) (also writer) and Blood (2012).

Filmography
He has directed episodes of the television series Paddington Green, Primeval, Occupation and the docudramas How Art Made the World, Surviving Disaster, Ancient Rome: The Rise and Fall of an Empire and Heroes and Villains. He also wrote the episodes for all the docudramas he directed.

References

External links

Living people
Place of birth missing (living people)
Year of birth missing (living people)
British film directors
British television directors
British television writers